Niccolò Sacchetti (1584 – 8 June 1650) was a Roman Catholic prelate who served as Bishop of Volterra (1634–1650).

Biography
Niccolò Sacchetti was born in 1584 in Firenze, Italy. On 25 September 1634, he was appointed during the papacy of Pope Urban VIII as Bishop of Volterra. On 22 October 1634, he was consecrated bishop by Giulio Cesare Sacchetti, Bishop of Fano, with Alphonse Sacrati, Bishop Emeritus of Comacchio, and Angelo Cesi, Bishop of Rimini, serving as co-consecrators. He served as Bishop of Volterra until his death on 8 June 1650.

While bishop, he was the principal co-consecrator of Lelio Falconieri, Titular Archbishop of Thebae (1634).

References 

17th-century Italian Roman Catholic bishops
Bishops appointed by Pope Urban VIII
1584 births
1650 deaths